Levan Shengelia (born 27 October 1995) is a Georgian professional footballer who plays as a winger for Super League Greece club Panetolikos.

International career
Shengelia made his Georgia national team debut on 12 October 2019 in a Euro 2020 qualifier against Republic of Ireland. He substituted Giorgi Kvilitaia in the 73rd minute. He made his first start in the next qualifier against Gibraltar on 15 October 2019 and provided two assists in a 3–2 victory.

Career statistics

References

External links
 
 
 Tubize player profile
 

1995 births
People from Samtredia
Living people
Footballers from Georgia (country)
Georgia (country) youth international footballers
Georgia (country) under-21 international footballers
Georgia (country) international footballers
Association football midfielders
FC Dila Gori players
FC Torpedo Kutaisi players
FC Kolkheti-1913 Poti players
A.F.C. Tubize players
FC Dinamo Tbilisi players
Konyaspor footballers
Oud-Heverlee Leuven players
Panetolikos F.C. players
Erovnuli Liga players
Belgian Pro League players
Challenger Pro League players
K League 2 players
Super League Greece players
Expatriate footballers from Georgia (country)
Expatriate footballers in Belgium
Expatriate footballers in South Korea
Expatriate footballers in Greece
Expatriate sportspeople from Georgia (country) in Belgium
Expatriate sportspeople from Georgia (country) in Turkey
Expatriate sportspeople from Georgia (country) in Greece